Dubautia plantaginea is a rare species of flowering plant in the aster family known by the common name plantainleaf dubautia. It is endemic to Hawaii where it is the only member of the silversword alliance that is found on all six of the largest islands (Kaua'i, O'ahu, Moloka'i, Lana'i, Maui, Hawai'i). Two of the three subspecies are rare and endangered. Like other Dubautia this plant is called na`ena`e.

This plant varies in morphology, taking the form of a small shrub to a tree up to 7 meters tall. There are three subspecies. The dwarf subspecies, ssp. humilis, is endemic to Maui, where there is only one population consisting of about 50 plants. This subspecies was federally listed as an endangered species in 1999. The ssp. magnifolia is a shrub or a tree which is endemic to Kaua'i, where there are no more than 2 populations remaining. It was listed as endangered in 2010.

These plants grow in moist and wet forest habitat with 75 to over 700 centimeters of precipitation annually.

Threats to this species and its habitat include landslides, rockslides, erosion, flooding, and invasive plant species such as Hilo grass (Paspalum conjugatum). The ssp. magnifolia was decimated by Hurricane Iniki in 1992.

References

External links

USDA Plants Profile for Dubautia plantaginea (plantainleaf dubautia)

plantaginea
Endemic flora of Hawaii
Biota of Hawaii (island)
Biota of Kauai
Biota of Lanai
Biota of Maui
Biota of Molokai
Biota of Oahu